Shlomit is a village in southern Israel. Located in the Negev desert, around 700 meters from the Egyptian border, it falls under the jurisdiction of Eshkol Regional Council.

History
The village was established in cooperation with Amana, the Ministry for the Development of the Negev and Galilee, and the Defense Ministry's settlement and national infrastructure unit. It initially consisted of mobile structures expected to be replaced by permanent housing. An industrial zone and educational institutions are also planned to be built there, alongside housing for 500 residents.

Jewish National Fund Argentina is a major contributor to the development of Shlomit.

References

Eshkol Regional Council
Villages in Israel
Gaza envelope
Populated places in Southern District (Israel)
Populated places established in 2011
2011 establishments in Israel